Houstonia spellenbergii is a plant species in the family Rubiaceae. It is native to the western part of the state of Chihuahua in northern Mexico, at an elevation of approximately 2100 m in the Sierra Madre Occidental near the Basaseáchic waterfall.

References

spellenbergii
Endemic flora of Mexico
Flora of Chihuahua (state)
Plants described in 1980